This is a list of revolutions, rebellions, insurrections, and uprisings.

BC

1–999 AD

1000–1499

1500–1699

 1501–1504: The Alvsson's rebellion against King Hans of Norway 
 1514: A peasants' war led by György Dózsa in the Kingdom of Hungary.
 1515: The Slovene peasant revolt.
 1515–1523: The Frisian rebellion of the Arumer Black Heap, led by Pier Gerlofs Donia and Wijerd Jelckama.
 1516: Trần Cảo Rebellion in Vietnam, against the Lê dynasty.
 1519–1523: The first Revolt of the Brotherhoods in Valencia, an anti-monarchist, anti-feudal, and anti-Muslim autonomist movement inspired by the Italian republics.
 1520–1522: The Revolt of the Comuneros against the rule of Spanish king and Holy Roman Emperor Charles V.
 1521–1522: The Santo Domingo Revolt, the first major slave revolt of the Americas, led by Maria Olofa and Gonzalo Mandinga, Senegalese Muslims of Wolof origin, in Dominican Republic. 
 1521–1523: Gustav Vasa's Rebellion a rebellion in which the nobleman Gustav Vasa successfully deposed King Christian II from the throne of Sweden.
 1524–1525: The German Peasants' War of in the Holy Roman Empire.
 1526: The slave revolt in San Miguel de Gualdape, the first slave rebellion by the first documented African slaves in the Americas against Spanish colonists.
 1531: The Straccioni Rebellion, uprising in Lucca. 
 1532–1547: Sebastián Lemba's rebellion, a 15-year uprising led by maroon Sebastián Lemba in Dominican Republic. 
 1536: The Pilgrimage of Grace against the Reformation of Henry VIII of England.
 1540–42: The Mixtón War, uprising of indigenous against Spanish rule in Mexico
 1542: The Dacke War in Sweden.
 1542: The failed rebellion of the India Juliana, an eslaved Guaraní woman from early-colonial Paraguay that killed her master (a Spanish colonizer) and urged other indigenous women to do the same.
 1548: The Revolt of the Pitauds was a French peasants' revolt against the salt tax.
 1548–1582: The Bayano Wars, a series of uprisings by the enslaved Bayano of Panama against the Spanish Empire.
 1549: The Prayer Book Rebellion in Cornwall and Devon, England.
 1549: Kett's Rebellion.
 1550–90: The Chichimeca War waged by various indigenous groups in northern Mexico against Spanish expansion.
 1566–1648: The Dutch Revolt against Spanish rule of the Netherlands, establishing the Dutch Republic.
 1567–1799 and beyond: Philippine revolts against Spain.
 1568–1571: The Morisco rebellions in Granada by the remnants of the Morisco community (Spanish Christian converts from Islam ["crypto-Muslims"]) in Habsburg Spain.
 1568–1648: Eighty Years' War; revolt of the Low Countries against Spain.
 1569–1570: The Rising of the North was an attempt by Catholic nobles in Northern England to depose Elizabeth I and replace her with Mary, Queen of Scots.
 1570–1618: Gaspar Yanga's revolt against Spanish colonial rule in Mexico, it ended with the signing of a treaty with Spain.
 1573: The Croatian–Slovene peasant revolt.
 1590–1610: The Celali rebellions in Ottoman Anatolia.
 1591–1594: The Rappenkrieg was a peasant uprising in Basel over the sales tax on wine and meat. 
 1594–1595: The Croquant rebellion was a revolt against taxation in Limousin
 1594–1603: The Nine Years' War or 'Tyrone's Rebellion' in Ulster, Ireland against English rule in Ireland.
 1594: The Banat Uprising.
 1596: The Club War uprising in Finland.
 1596–97: The Serb Uprising against the Ottomans.
 1597: First Guale revolt developed in Florida against the Spanish missions and led by Juanillo (the Juanillo's revolt).
 1598: The First Tarnovo uprising was a Bulgarian uprising against Ottoman rule based in the former Bulgarian capital, Tarnovo.
 1600: Thessaly Rebellion.
 1601: Acaxee Rebellion an insurrection against Spanish rule in Mexico perpetrated by Acaxee Native Americans.
 1606–1607: The Bolotnikov rebellion for the abolition of serfdom, which was part of the Time of Troubles in Russia.
 1616–1620: The Tepehuán Revolt was when the Tepehuánes of Durango revolted against the Spaniards.
 1618–1625: The Bohemian Revolt against the Habsburgs. Rebellion was part of Thirty Years' War.
 1631–1634: The Salt Tax Revolt in Biscay.
 1637–1638: The Shimabara Rebellion of Japanese Christians.
 1639: The Revolt of the va-nu-pieds against the salt tax in Normandy. 
 1640: The Portuguese Revolt against Spanish Empire.
 1640–1652: The Catalan Revolt.
 1640–1644: The Vlach uprising against Habsburg rule in Moravia.
 1641: The Irish Rebellion of 1641.
1641: The Acclamation of Amador Bueno in the Captaincy of São Vicente, Brazil.
 1642–1660: The English Revolution, commencing as a civil war between Parliament and the King, and culminating in the execution of Charles I and the establishment of a republican Commonwealth, which was succeeded several years later by the Protectorate of Oliver Cromwell.
 1644: The Li Zicheng Uprising overthrew the Ming dynasty.
 1645: Second Guale revolt against the Spanish missions in Florida, nearly shaking off the missions. 
 1647: The Naples Revolt.
 1648: The Khmelnytsky uprising of Cossacks in Ukraine against Polish nobility in the Polish–Lithuanian Commonwealth.
 1648: The Moscow salt riot.
 1648–1653: The Fronde, a series of civil wars between the French monarchy and the nobility, princes, parlements and common people of France.
 1658: The revolt of Abaza Hasan Pasha in the Ottoman Empire.
 1659: The Bakhtrioni uprising in Kingdom of Kakheti against the political domination of Safavid Persia.
 1664–1670: Magnate conspiracy: The Zrinski, Wesselényi and Frankopan uprising against the Habsburgs.
 1665–1709: The Kongo Civil War under the Kingdom of the Congo.
 1667–1668: The First Revolt of the Angelets against the salt tax in Vallespir.
 1668: The Sikhs in the Anandpur revolted against the Mughal Empire.
 1668–1676: The Solovetsky Monastery uprising.
 1669: The Jat uprising under Gokula. The Hindu Jats in the Agra district revolted against the Mughal Emperor Aurangzeb.
 1670–74: The Second Revolt of the Angelets against the salt tax in Conflent.
 1672: The Pasthun rebellion against the Mughals.
 1672–1674: The Lipka rebellion, an uprising of Polish Tatars against the Polish–Lithuanian Commonwealth.
 1672–1678: The Messina Revolt. The Sicilian revolt against Spanish rule took place during the Franco-Dutch War of Louis XIV; the rebels were supported by France.
 1674–1680: The Trunajaya rebellion. Followers of the Madurese prince Trunajaya rebelled against the Mataram Sultanate. They were ultimately defeated by Mataram with help from the Dutch East India Company.
 1675: The Revolt of the papier timbré was an anti-tax revolt in Brittany. 
 1675–1676: King Philip's War between Indians and English settlers, sometimes called Metacom's Rebellion.
 1676: The Bashkir Rebellion against Russian rule.
 1676: Bacon's Rebellion in Virginia.
 1680–1692: The Pueblo Revolt against Spanish settlers in New Mexico.
 1682: The Moscow Uprising of the Moscow Streltsy regiments.
1684: The Beckman's Revolt in Maranhão e Grão-Pará, Brazil.
 1685: The Monmouth Rebellion and Argyll Rebellion, coordinated attempts to overthrow King James II in England and Scotland respectively.
 1686: The Second Tarnovo uprising is a Bulgarian uprising against Ottoman rule based in the former Bulgarian capital, Tarnovo, that was severely crushed by the Ottoman authorities.
 1688: Chiprovtsi uprising was an uprising against Ottoman rule organized in northwestern Bulgaria by Roman Catholic Bulgarians, but also involving many Eastern Orthodox Christians.
 1688: The Siamese revolution of 1688, the overthrow of pro-foreign Siamese king Narai by Mandarin Phetracha.
 1688: The Glorious Revolution in England overthrew King James II and established a Whig-dominated Protestant constitutional monarchy.
 1688–1746: The Jacobite risings were a series of uprisings, rebellions, and wars in the British Isles occurring between 1688 and 1746.
 1687–1689: The Revolt of the Barretinas in Catalonia, prompted by the quartering & upkeep of Spanish soldiers, and intensified by French agents.
 1688–1689:  Glorious Revolution in the Netherlands. The Dutch Republic was established after William of Orange led a successful rebellion against the French-supported Catholic monarchs of the Netherlands.
 1689: Karposh’s Rebellion was a Bulgarian anti-Ottoman uprising in the Central Balkans that took place in October 1689.
 1689: The Boston revolt led to the dissolution of the Dominion of New England and the ouster of several colonial officials appointed by King James II.
 1693: The Second Brotherhood in Valencia, prompted by feudal taxation.
 1698: The Streltsy uprising in Russia.

1700–1799

 1702–1715: The War of the Camisards in France.
 1703–1711: The Rákóczi Uprising against the Habsburgs.
 1707–1709: The Bulavin Rebellion in Imperial Russia.
1707–1709: The Newcomers' War (Guerra dos Emboabas) in the Captaincy of São Vicente, Brazil.
 1709: Mirwais Hotak, an Afghan tribal leader, led a successful rebellion against Gurgin Khan, the Persian governor of Kandahar.
 1709-1710: Pablo Presbere's insurrection against Spanish colonial power
1710-1711: Peddlers' War (Guerra dos Mascates) in Pernambuco, Brazil.
 1711: Cary's Rebellion, an uprising against the government in North Carolina.
 1712: The Tzeltal Rebellion, multiethnic indigenous rebellion in Mexico against Spanish rule.
 1712: The unsuccessful New York Slave Revolt of 1712.
 1715: The First Jacobite rising in the north of England and in Cornwall, advocating the claims of James Stuart, the Old Pretender against the newly installed House of Hanover.
1720: The Vila Rica Revolt in Minas Gerais, Brazil.
 1722: Afghan rebels defeated Shah Sultan Husayn and ended the Safavid dynasty.
 1728–1740: The First Maroon War, an uprising of Jamaican Maroons against the British Empire.
 1729: Natchez revolt – Attack by the Natchez on French colonists.
 1731: Samba rebellion – Plot by African slaves in French Louisiana to rebel.
 1733–1734: The slave insurrection on St. John against the Danish Empire, one of the earliest and longest slave revolts in the Americas. The slaves intended to resume crop production under their own free control, but the revolt was crushed by the French.
 1739: The Stono Rebellion in the colony of South Carolina, the largest slave uprising in the British-American colonies.
 1741: The New York Conspiracy of 1741, a purported plot by slaves and poor whites in the British colony of New York to revolt and level New York City with a series of fires.
 1743: The Fourth Dalecarlian rebellion in Sweden.
 1744–1829: The Dagohoy rebellion in the Philippines that lasted for 85 years.
 1745–1746: The Jacobite rising in Scotland.
 1748: Uprising led by Juan Francisco de León in Panaquire, Venezuela, against monopoly interests and the dominance of the Royal Company Guipuzcoana in terms of trade cocoa.
 1749: The Conspiracy of the Slaves, a slave rebellion in Malta.
 1751–1752: Pima Revolt
 1753: The Lunenburg Rebellion, a brief and unsuccessful immigrant rebellion during Father Le Loutre's War in Nova Scotia.
 1755–1769: The revolution that ended Genoese rule and established a Corsican Republic under Enlightenment principles. The revolution was brought to an end by the French conquest of Corsica
 1760: Tacky's War, an uprising of enslaved Akan people against white planters in Jamaica.
 1763: The Berbice slave uprising, a slave revolt in Guyana.
 1763–1766: Pontiac's War by numerous North American Indian tribes who joined the uprising in an effort to drive British soldiers and settlers out of the Great Lakes region.
 1765–1783: The American Revolution in eastern North America.
 1765: Quito Revolt of 1765, an uprising against the Viceroyalty of New Granada.
 1765: Strilekrigen, a farmer's rebellion, that took place in Bergen in Norway.
 1768: The Louisiana Rebellion of 1768 by Creole and German settlers objecting to the turnover of the Louisiana Territory from New France to New Spain.
1769–1773: First Carib War, military conflict between the Carib inhabitants of Saint Vincent and British military forces supporting British efforts at colonial expansion on the island. 
 1770: The Orlov revolt in Peloponnese.
 1770: The Abdzakh revolution. The Circassians of the Abdzakh region started a great revolution in Circassian territory in 1770. Classes such as slaves, nobles and princes were completely abolished. The Abdzakh Revolution coincides with the French Revolution. While many French nobles took refuge in Russia, some of the Circassian nobles took the same path and took refuge in Russia.
 1771–1785: The Tây Sơn wars, annihilation of the ruling Trịnh and Nguyễn clans as well as the Lê dynasty in Đại Việt.
 1773–1775: Pugachev's Rebellion was the largest peasant revolt in Russia's history. Between the end of the Pugachev rebellion and the beginning of the 19th century, there were hundreds of outbreaks across Russia.
 1775: The Rising of the Priests in Malta.
 1775–1783: The American Revolutionary War establishes independence of the thirteen North American colonies from Great Britain, creating the republic of the United States of America.
 1780–1782: José Gabriel Condorcanqui, known as Túpac Amaru II, raises an indigenous peasant army in revolt against Spanish control of Peru. Julián Apasa, known as Túpac Katari allied with Túpac Amaru and lead an indigenous revolt in Alto Peru (present-day Bolivia) nearly destroying the city of La Paz in a siege.
 1780–1787: The Patriot Revolt against Orangist rule in the Dutch Republic. 
 1781: The Revolt in Bihar was an uprising by certain chieftains in the Indian state of Bihar against the British East India Company.
 1781: The Revolt of the Comuneros against the Viceroyalty of New Granada.
 1782: The Sylhet uprising was a religiously motivated revolt in the Sylhet region against the British East India Company. 
 1782: The Geneva Revolution, a short-lived revolt by the third estate against the oligarchic Republic of Geneva.
 1786–1787: Shays' Rebellion in Massachusetts against court proceedings collecting taxes and debts
 1786–1787: Lofthusreisingen, a large farmer's rebellion in Agder in Norway.
 1787: The Abaco Slave Revolt was the first slave revolt in the Bahamas.
 1788: Kočina Krajina Serb rebellion, against the Ottoman Empire
 1789–1799: The French Revolution is regarded as one of the most influential of all modern socio-political revolutions and is associated with the rise of the bourgeoisie and the downfall of the aristocracy.
 1789–1790: Brabant Revolution in the Austrian Netherlands (modern Belgium) crushed in 1790.
 1789–1791: Liège Revolution, the price-bishops of Liège were overthrown by a popular uprising
 1790: Saxon Peasants' Revolt sparked by noble gamekeeping rights and exacerbated by a harsh winter and summer drought. Raged during summer 1790, but crushed militarily by September.
 1790: The first slave revolt in the British Virgin Islands.
 1791: Whiskey Rebellion in western Pennsylvania, United States. 
 1791: The Mina conspiracy, a slave revolt in the self-organized African-American Mina community.
 1791–1804: The Haitian Revolution: A successful slave rebellion, led by Toussaint Louverture, establishes Haiti as the first free, black republic in modern history.
 1792: The Polish War in Defence of the Constitution against the Russian Empire.
 1793: Slave rebellion produced in the Guadeloupe island following the outbreak of the French Revolution.
 1793: Jumla rebellion, a revolt in Jumla against the Gorkhali conquest
 1793–1796: The War in the Vendée was popular uprising against the Republican government during the French Revolution.
 1794: The Kościuszko Uprising, also known as the Polish Revolt, led by Tadeusz Kościuszko in a failed attempt to liberate the Commonwealth of Poland from Imperial Russia and Kingdom of Prussia.
 1794: Protests over taxes leads to the Whiskey Rebellion in Pittsburgh and the Monongahela Valley. President George Washington invokes martial law and crushes insurrection with 13,000 troops.
 1794–1795: The Stäfner Handel uprising in the Republic of Zürich.
 1795: The Batavian Revolution overthrows Orangist rule of the Dutch Republic and establishes the Batavian Republic, with French backing.
 1795: The Curaçao Slave Revolt against the Dutch Colonial Empire
 1795–1796: In those years broke out several slave rebellions in the entire Caribbean, influenced by the Haitian Revolution: in Cuba, Jamaica (Second Maroon War), Dominica (Colihault Uprising), Louisiana (Pointe Coupée conspiracy), Saint Lucia (Bush War, so-called "Guerre des Bois"), Saint Vincent (Second Carib War), Grenada (Fédon's rebellion), Curaçao (led by Tula), Guyana (Demerara Rebellion) and in Coro, Venezuela (led by José Leonardo Chirino).
 1796: The Conspiracy of Equals, a failed attempt to remove the French Directory, and replace its rule with an egalitarian and proto-socialist republic.
 1796: Boca de Nigua Revolt, a major slave uprising in Dominican Republic led by Francisco Sopo. 
 1796–1804: The White Lotus Rebellion against the Qing dynasty of China.
 1797: The Spithead and Nore mutinies were two major mutinies by sailors of the British Royal Navy.
 1797: 1797 Rugby School Rebellion.
 1797: The failed Scottish Rebellion against the Kingdom of Great Britain.
 1797-1804: The Haitian revolution 
 1798: The Irish Rebellion of 1798 failed to overthrow British rule in Ireland.
 1798: The Maltese Revolt in September 1798 against French administration in Malta. The French capitulated in September 1800 after they were blockaded inside the islands' harbour fortifications for two years.
 1799–1800: Fries's Rebellion was a tax revolt among Pennsylvania Dutch farmers, led by John Fries.

1800–1849

 pre-1800–1872: Philippines revolts against Spain (See also 1896 and 1898 in this list).
 1800: Gabriel Prosser's suppressed slave rebellion in Virginia.
 1800–1802: A farmer rebellion in Lærdal, Norway against military conscription.
 1803: The rebellion of Robert Emmet in Dublin, Ireland against British rule.

 1803: The Igbo Landing, a slave ship revolt off the coast of St. Simons, Georgia, in which the enslaved Igbo people committed mass suicide rather than submit to slavery in the United States.
 1804: Castle Hill convict rebellion.
 1804–1817: The Serbian Revolution against Ottoman rule erupts.
 1804–1813: The First Serbian uprising against Ottomans.
 1805: An unsuccessful slave rebellion at Chatham Manor
 1807: Tican's Rebellion in Serbia against Austrian rule.
 1808: Rum Rebellion.
 1808: Kruščica Rebellion in Serbia against Austrian rule.
 1808: The Dos de Mayo Uprising against the occupation of Madrid by French troops.

 1808–1814: The Peninsular War.
 1808–1833: Spanish American Wars of independence, successful war in which Simón Bolivar had an important role and, saw the creation of Colombia, Venezuela, Ecuador and many other countries
 1809–1810: The rebellion of Velu Thampi Dalawa of Travancore.
 1809: The city of Chuquisaca, modern Sucre, starts the Chuquisaca Revolution.
 1809: The city of La Paz starts the La Paz revolution, headed by Pedro Murillo.
 1809: Tyrolean Rebellion against French occupation forces, crushed after two months with the execution of its main leader Andreas Hofer,
 1809–1825: Bolivian War of Independence, 
 1809–1826: Peruvian War of Independence, 
 1810: The House Tax Hartal was an occasion of nonviolent resistance to protest a tax in parts of British India, with a particularly noteworthy example of hartal (a form of general strike) in the vicinity of Varanasi. 
 1810: The West Florida rebellion against Spain, eventually becomes a short-lived republic.
 1810–1821: The Mexican War of Independence, a revolution against Spanish colonialism.
 1810: The Viceroy of the Río de la Plata Baltasar Hidalgo de Cisneros is deposed during the May Revolution.
 1810–1818: Argentine War of Independence,
 1810–1823: Venezuelan War of Independence,
 1810–1826: Chilean War of Independence,
 1811: Paraguayan Revolt; Successful bloodless overthrow of the Spanish government in Paraguay by José Gaspar Rodríguez de Francia, Fulgencio Yegros, Pedro Caballero and other military members.
 1811: The German Coast uprising, a revolt of slaves in parts of the Territory of Orleans, the uprising was the largest slave insurrection in US history.
 1811: The 1811 Independence Movement, an unsuccessful revolt against Spanish rule in colonial El Salvador led by José Matías Delgado, Manuel José Arce, Juan Manuel Rodríguez and Santiago José Celis.
 1812: The peasant rebellion of Hong Gyeong-nae against the Joseon dynasty of Korea.
 1812: The Aponte conspiracy, a large-scale slave rebellion in Cuba. 
 1812: The rebellion in protest against slavery led by José Leocadio, Pedro de Seda, and Pedro Henríquez in Dominican Republic.
 1814: Norwegian War of Independence.
 1814: Hadži Prodan's Revolt in Serbia against Ottoman rule.
 1815: George Boxley's slave rebellion in Spotsylvania County, Virginia.
 1815–1817: The Second Serbian uprising against Ottomans.
 1816: Bussa's rebellion, the largest slave revolt in Barbadian history.
 1816–1858: The Seminole Wars, a series of uprisings by the Seminoles against the intensification of United States colonialism in Florida.
 1817: The Pernambucan Revolt, a republican separatist movement which resulted in the creation of the short-lived Republic of Pernambuco (7 March 1817 – 20 May 1817).
 1817: The Pentrich rising, Derbyshire; an ill-fated attempt to overthrow the Government, unknowingly it was instigated by William Oliver, aka Oliver the Spy. Three men were executed in November 1817, and fourteen men were transported to NSW. The event is known as 'England's Last Revolution' (9–10 June 1817).
 1817: The Paika Rebellion was a failed uprising against the British East India Company in the Indian state of Odisha.
 1817–1818: The Uva-Wellassa Rebellion against the British conquest of Kandy, followed by their colonial rule in Ceylon
 1820: The Revolutions of 1820 were a wave of revolutions attempting to establish liberal constitutional monarchies in Italy, Spain and Portugal.
 1820: Radical War or "Scottish Insurrection".
 1820–1822: Ecuadorian War of Independence, fight between several South American armies and Spain over control of the lands of the Royal Audience of Quito.
 1820–1824: The revolutionary war of independence in Peru led by José de San Martín.
 1821: Marcos Xiorro's conspiracy to incite a slave revolt in Spanish Puerto Rico.
 1821: The Wallachian uprising against the Ottoman Empire.
 1821–1829: The Greek War of Independence.
 1822: Denmark Vesey's suppressed slave uprising in South Carolina.
 1822–1823: The republican revolution in Mexico overthrows Emperor Agustín de Iturbide.
 1822–1825: The Brazilian War of Independence.
 1823: The Demerara rebellion of 1823, a non-violent uprising of over 10,000 slaves in Guyana against the British colonial government
 1824: The Chumash revolt of 1824, uprising of indigenous people of the Central Coast of California against the Mexican government
 1825: The Decembrist revolt in Russian Empire.
 1825–1830: The Java War or Dipanegara Revolution, when the prince of Mataram Islam against the tax and land rent domination from Dutch.
 1826: The Janissary revolts in Ottoman Empire.
 1826-1827: The Fredonian Rebellion in Texas, a failed local attempt to secede from Mexico
 1826–1828: The Lao rebellion an attempted but suppressed rebellion to restore the former kingdom of Lan Xang.
 1827–1828: The failed conservative rebellion in Mexico led by Nicolás Bravo.
 1828–1834: The Liberal Wars against conservative absolutists restore a liberal constitutional monarchy to Portugal.
 1829: The Bathurst War in New South Wales in Australia between Australian Aboriginals and European colonists.
 1829–1832: The War of the Maidens in Ariège, France. Countrymen dressed as women resisted the new forestry law, which restricted their use of the forest.
 1830: The Revolutions of 1830 were a wave of Romantic nationalist revolutions in Europe.
 The Belgian Revolution was a conflict in the United Kingdom of the Netherlands that began with a riot in Brussels in August 1830 and eventually led to the establishment of an independent, Catholic and neutral Belgium.
 The July Revolution was a revolt by the middle class against Bourbon King Charles X which forced him out of office and replaced him with the Orleanist King Louis-Philippe (the "July Monarchy").
 The November uprising in Poland against the Russian Empire.
 The Ustertag revolution occurred in the Canton of Zurich.

 1830: The Bathurst Rebellion, a convict uprising near Bathurst, New South Wales, Australia.
 1830–1833: Yagan's War, a revolt by the Noongar people against British rule.
 1830–1836: The Tithe War was a campaign of civil disobedience in Ireland, in reaction to the enforcement of tithes on the Catholic majority for the upkeep of the established state church – the Church of Ireland. 
 1831: Nat Turner's slave rebellion, an uprising in Southampton County, Virginia that was suppressed by the United States.
 1831: The Merthyr Rising in South Wales.

 1831, 1834, 1848: The Canut revolts by Lyonnais silk workers (French: canuts)
 1831–1832: The Bosnian uprising in Ottoman Empire.
 1831–1832: The Baptist War, an eleven-day slave rebellion in the colony of Jamaica. 
 1832: The June Rebellion in France.
 1832-1833: Anastasio Aquino's Rebellion
 1832–1843: Abdelkader's rebellion in French-occupied Algeria.
 1833–1835: Lê Văn Khôi revolt in Vietnam, against Nguyễn dynasty
 1834: Flores' Rebellion, an anti-constitutionalist rebellion in Nicaragua.
 1834–1859: Imam Shamil's rebellion in Russian-occupied Caucasus.
 1835–1836: Texas secedes from Mexico in the Texas Revolution.
 1835: The Malê revolt, a rebellion of the enslaved Yoruba people against the Empire of Brazil. 
 1835-1840: The Cabanagem was a popular revolution and pro-separatist movement that occurred in the then province of Grão-Pará, Empire of Brazil.
 1835–1845: The Ragamuffin War, Separatists gauchos revolutionaries declared the independence of the Rio Grande do Sul from Brazil.
 1837: Revolt of 1837 (New Mexico), also known as the Chimayó Rebellion, against the Mexican governor of New Mexico
 1837–1838: The Rebellions of 1837 and the Upper Canada Rebellion: failed republican revolutions against British rule in Canada.
 1837-1838: The Sabinada was a revolt by military officer Francisco Sabino that occurred in Brazil's Bahia province.
1838-1841: The Balaiada was a social revolt between 1838 and 1841 in the interior of the Province of Maranhão, Brazil.
 1839: The Amistad Rebellion, a slave ship revolt that was initially successful but ended with the eventual capture of the slaves by the United States.
 1839–1843: The Rebecca Riots were a series of protests undertaken by farmers and agricultural workers in Wales, in response to perceived unfair taxation
 1841: Creole revolt, a successful slave revolt aboard the Creole, ending with their arrival at Nassau, where slavery was abolished.
 1841-1842: Dorr Rebellion in Rhode Island
 1841–1842: The Afghan uprising. Hostile Afghan tribes massacred Elphinstone's British army including some 12,000 civilian dependents and camp followers.
 1842: The Slave Revolt in the Cherokee Nation, an attempted escape of slaves from the Cherokee, that ended with their capture.
 1845 - 1872 The New Zealand Wars.
 1846: The Greater Poland uprising against Austrian rule.
 The failed Kraków uprising ends in slaughter.
 1846: Bear Flag Rebellion in Alta California, quickly subsumed in the U.S. military takeover of the territory
 1847: The Caste War of Yucatán, revolt of Maya against the Mexican state.
 1847: The Taos Revolt in New Mexico against the United States.
 1847: The Sonderbund War, a revolt by the Swiss Confederation against the centralization of power by Catholic cantons, resulting in the rise of Switzerland as a federal state.

 1848: The Revolutions of 1848 were a wave of failed liberal and republican revolutions that swept through Europe.
 The French Revolution of 1848 led to the creation of the French Second Republic.
 The Revolutions of 1848 in the Italian states.
 The Revolutions of 1848 in the German states.
 The Revolutions of 1848 in the Austrian Empire
 The Hungarian Revolution of 1848 grew into a war for independence from Austrian Empire.
 The Slovak Uprising of 1848–49.
 The Revolutions of 1848 in the Danish States started in the German speaking cities of Altona and Kiel. It spilled into a peaceful revolution in Copenhagen, which abolished absolutism in favor of parliamentary constitutional monarchy, and a counter-revolutionary war against the German speaking minority.
 The March Unrest.
 The Czech Revolution of 1848.
 The Greater Poland uprising.
 The Young Irelander Rebellion of 1848 took place during the Great Famine.
 Serbian Revolution of 1848.
 Wallachian Revolution of 1848.
 Moldavian Revolution of 1848.
 1848: Matale Rebellion A rebellion in Ceylon against British colonial rule.
1848-1849: Beach Rebellion (Revolução Praieira) in Pernambuco, Brazil.

1850–1899

 

 1851–64: The Taiping Rebellion by the God Worshippers against the Qing dynasty of China. In total between 20 and 30 million lives had been lost, making it the second deadliest war in human history.
 1852: The Kautokeino rebellion in Kautokeino, Norway.
 1852–62: The Herzegovina Uprising (1852–62) in Ottoman Herzegovina.
 1853–55: The Small Knife Society rebellion in Shanghai, China.
 1854: A revolution in Spain against the Moderate Party Government.
 1854: The Eureka Rebellion (Eureka Stockade) in Ballarat, Victoria, Australia. Miners battled British Colonial forces against taxation policies of the Government.
 1854–56: Peasant Rebel in Vietnam, led by Cao Ba Quat, against the Nguyễn dynasty.
 1854–56: The Red Turban Rebellion (1854–1856) in Guangdong (Canton), China.
 1854–73: The Miao Rebellion in China.
 1854–55: The Revolution of Ayutla in Mexico.
 1855–73: The Panthay Rebellion by Chinese Muslims against the Qing dynasty.
 1857: The Indian rebellion against British East India Company, marking the end of Mughal rule in India. Also known as the 1857 War of Independence and, particularly in the West, the Sepoy Mutiny.
 1858: The Mahtra War in Estonia.
 1858: Pecija's First Revolt, in Ottoman Bosnia.
 1858–61: The War of the Reform in Mexico.
 1859: John Brown's raid on Harpers Ferry, an effort by abolitionist John Brown to initiate an armed slave revolt in Southern states by taking over Harpers Ferry Armory in Virginia.
 1859: The Second Italian War of Independence.
 1861–65: The American Civil War in the United States, between the United States and the Confederate States of America, which was formed out of eleven southern states.
 1863–65: A counter-rebellion occurred in the self-declared Free State of Jones in Mississippi.
 1861–66: Quantrill's Raiders in Missouri.
 1862: The Sioux Uprising in Minnesota.
 1862–77: The Muslim Rebellion by Chinese Muslims against the Qing dynasty.
 1862: The 23 October 1862 Revolution was a popular insurrection which led to the overthrow of King Otto of Greece.
 1863: The New York Draft riots.
 1863–65: The January Uprising was the Polish uprising against the Russian Empire.
 1864–65: The Mejba Revolt was a rebellion in Tunisia against the doubling of an unpopular poll tax imposed by Sadok Bey.
 1865: The Morant Bay rebellion.
 1866: The Uprising of Polish political exiles in Siberia.
 1866–68: The Meiji Restoration and modernization revolution in Japan. Samurai uprising leads to overthrow of shogunate and establishment of "modern" parliamentary, Western-style system.
 1867: The Fenian Rising: an attempt at a nationwide rebellion by the Irish Republican Brotherhood against British rule.
 1868: The Glorious Revolution in Spain deposes Queen Isabella II.
 1868: The Grito de Lares was the first major revolt against Spanish rule in Puerto Rico. The rebels proclaimed the independence of Puerto Rico from Spain.
 Ten Years' War (1868–1878), also known as the Great War (Guerra Grande) and the War of '68, was part of Cuba's fight for independence from Spain, led by Cuban-born planters (especially by Carlos Manuel de Céspedes) and other wealthy natives.
 1869–70: The Red River Rebellion, the events surrounding the actions of a provisional government established by Métis leader Louis Riel at the Red River Colony, Manitoba, Canada.
 1870–72: The Revolution of the Lances, the National Party revolts against the Colorado Government in Uruguay.
 1871: The Paris Commune.
 1871–72: Porfirio Díaz rebels against President Benito Juárez of Mexico.
 1871: The liberal revolution in Guatemala.
 1873: The Petroleum Revolution in the First Spanish Republic.
 1873–74: The Cantonal rebellion in the First Spanish Republic.
 1875: The Deccan Riots.
 1875: The Stara Zagora Uprising, a revolt by the Bulgarian population against Ottoman rule.
 1875–76: The Svaneti uprising of 1875–1876
 1875–78: The Great Eastern Crisis:
 1875–77: The Herzegovinian rebellion, the most famous of the rebellions against the Ottoman Empire in Herzegovina; unrest soon spread to other areas of Ottoman Bosnia.
 1876: The April uprising, a revolt by the Bulgarian population against Ottoman rule.
 1876: The Razlovtsi insurrection, a revolt by the Bulgarian population against Ottoman rule, part of the April Uprising.
 1876–78: Serbian-Turkish Wars (1876–1878)
 1876–78: Montenegrin–Ottoman War (1876–78)
 1877–78: Romanian War of Independence
 1878: Kumanovo Uprising
 1878: Kresna–Razlog uprising, a revolt by the Bulgarian population against Ottoman rule.
 1878 Greek Macedonian rebellion
 Epirus Revolt of 1878
 Cretan Revolt (1878)
 1876: The second rebellion by Porfirio Díaz against President Sebastián Lerdo de Tejada of Mexico.
 1877: The Satsuma Rebellion of Satsuma ex-samurai against the Meiji government.
 1879: Little War (Cuba) or Small War, second of three conflicts between Cuban rebels and Spain. It started on 26 August 1879 and ended in rebel defeat in September 1880.
 1879–1882: The Urabi Revolt: an uprising in Egypt on 11 June 1882 against the Khedive and European influence in the country. It was led by and named after Colonel Ahmed Urabi.
 1880–1881: The Brsjak revolt.
 1883: The Timok Rebellion was a popular uprising that began in eastern Serbia.
 1885: A peasant revolt in the Ancash region of Peru led by Pedro Pablo Atusparía succeeds in occupying the Callejón de Huaylas for several months.
 1885–96: Cần Vương movement of Vietnam, led by emperor Hàm Nghi, against French colonialism
 1885: The North-West Rebellion of Métis in Saskatchewan.
 1885: Bulgarian unification - accomplished after revolts in Eastern Rumelian towns, followed by a coup.
 1888: The Peasant Rebellion in Banten, Indonesia.
 1890–1914: The Saminism Movement in Indonesia.
 1890: Revolution of the Park, Argentina.
 1893: Revolution of 1893, Argentina
 1893: A liberal revolt brings José Santos Zelaya to power in Nicaragua.
 1894–95: The Donghak Peasant Revolution: Korean peasants led by Jeon Bong-jun revolted against the Joseon dynasty; the revolt was crushed by Japanese and Chinese intervention, leading to First Sino-Japanese War.
 1895: The revolution against President Andrés Avelino Cáceres in Peru ushers in a period of stable constitutional rule.
 1895-1896: The War of Canudos was a conflict between the First Brazilian Republic and the residents of Canudos in the northeastern state of Bahia.
 1895–1896: The First Italo-Ethiopian War in which Ethiopians fought against Italians colonizers.
 Cuban War of Independence (1895–1898), the last of three liberation wars that Cuba fought against Spain, being this initiated by José Martí.
 1896: Yaqui Uprising in Sonora and Arizona
 1896–98: The Philippine Revolution, a war of independence against Spanish rule directed by the Katipunan society.
 1897: The Intentona de Yauco (Attempted Coup of Yauco), was the second and last major revolt against Spanish colonial rule in Puerto Rico, staged by Puerto Rico's pro-independence movement.
 1898: The Dukchi Ishan (Andican Uprising): Kirgiz, Uzbek, and Kipcak peoples rebelled against Tsarist Russia in Turkestan (Fargana Valley).
 1898: The Hut Tax War was a resistance in the newly annexed Protectorate of Sierra Leone to a new, severe tax imposed by the colonial military governor.
 1898: The Dog Tax War was a confrontation between the Colony of New Zealand and a group of Northern Māori, led by Hone Riiwi Toia, opposed to the enforcement of a 'dog tax'.
 1898: The Wilmington insurrection of 1898, A mob of white supremacists forced out the city government of Wilmington, North Carolina.
 1899: The tancament de caixes, a tax revolt in Barcelona.
 1899–1902: The Philippine–American War, an insurgency against the imposition of colonial rule by the United States following the transfer of the Philippines from Spain to the U.S. in the Treaty of Paris which ended the Spanish–American War.
 1899–1901: The Boxer Rebellion against foreign influence in areas such as trade, politics, religion and technology that occurred in China during the final years of the Qing dynasty, which was defeated by the Eight-Nation Alliance.
 1899–1962: The Mau was a non-violent movement for Samoan independence from colonial rule (by Germany and then New Zealand) during the first half of the 20th century.

1900s

 1901–1936: Holy Man's Rebellion.
 1903: The Ilinden–Preobrazhenie Uprising breaks out in the Ottoman Empire.
 1904: Revolution of 1904
 1904: A liberal revolution in Paraguay.
 1904–1908: Macedonian Struggle.
 1904–1908: Herero Wars.
 1905: Argentine Revolution of 1905.
 1905–1906: The Persian/Iranian constitutional revolution.
 1905–1906: The Maji Maji Rebellion in German East Africa.
 1905: Shoubak Revolt.
 1905: Łódź insurrection.
 1905–1907: Revolution in the Kingdom of Poland (1905–07).
 1905–1906: 1905 Tibetan Rebellion.
 1905–1907: 1905 Russian Revolution, which was abortive and ultimately crushed, though forming the critical precedent for the 1917 Russian Revolution.
 1906: Bambatha Rebellion.
 1906–1908: Theriso revolt.
 1907: The Romanian Peasants' Revolt.
 1908: The Young Turk Revolution: Young Turks force the autocratic ruler Abdul Hamid II to restore parliament and constitution in the Ottoman Empire.
 1909: HNLMS De Zeven Provinciën (1909).
 1909: Hauran Druze Rebellion.

1910s

 1910–1920: The Mexican Revolution overthrows the dictator Porfirio Díaz; seizure of power by the National Revolutionary Party (later called Institutional Revolutionary Party).
 1910: The republican revolution in Portugal.
 1910: The Albanian Revolt of 1910 against Ottoman centralization policies in Albania.
 1910–1911: The Sokehs Rebellion erupts in German-ruled Micronesia. Its primary leader, Somatau, is executed soon after being captured.
 1911–1912: The Xinhai Revolution overthrows the ruling Qing dynasty and establishment of the Republic of China.
 1911–1912: The East Timorese rebellion against colonial Portugal.
 1912: The Albanian Revolt of 1912 against Ottoman Empire rule in Albania.
 1912-1916: The Contestado War was a guerrilla war for land between settlers and landowners in South Brazil.
 1913: The Second Revolution against President Yuan Shikai of China.
 1914: The Ten Days War was a shooting war involving irregular forces of coal miners using dynamite and rifles on one side, opposed to the Colorado National Guard, Baldwin Felts detectives, and mine guards deploying machine guns, cannon and aircraft on the other, occurring in the aftermath of the Ludlow massacre. The Ten Days War ended when federal troops intervened.
 1914–1915: The Boer Revolt against the British in South Africa.
 1914: The revolt of Peasants of Central Albania overthrows Prince William of Wied.
 1915: The Armenian revolt in city of Van against the Ottomans in Turkey.
 1915–1916: The National Protection War against the Empire of China headed by Emperor Yuan Shikai. The Republic of China was restored.
 1915–1916: The Tapani incident is the last major Chinese uprising in Taiwan during the Japanese colonial era.
 1916: The Easter Rising in Dublin, Ireland during which the Irish Republic was proclaimed.
 1916: An anti-French uprising in Algeria.
 1916: The Central Asian Revolt started when the Russian Empire government ended its exemption of Muslims from military service.
 1916: Cochinchina uprising of Vietnam against French colonialism
 1916–1917: The Tuareg rebellion against French colonial rule of the area around the Aïr Mountains of northern Niger.
 1916–1918: The Arab Revolt with the aim of securing independence from the Ottoman Empire.
 1916–1923: The Irish War of Independence, the period of nationalist rebellion, guerrilla warfare, political change and civil war which brought about the establishment of the independent nation, the Irish Free State. Sparking the Irish Civil War between pro-treaty forces and pro-republic forces
 1916–1947: The Indian people's struggle against the British for Indian Independence.
 1917: The French Army Mutinies.
 1917: Thái Nguyên uprising of Vietnam, led by Trinh Van Can, against French colonialism
 1917: The February Revolution made Tsar Nicholas II abdicate and abolishes the Russian monarchy
 1917: The Green Corn Rebellion takes place in rural Oklahoma.
 1917: The October Revolution in Russia: Bolsheviks take over the provisional government of the Russian Republic, instituting the first socialist society in the world. The chaos leads to the final collapse of the Russian Empire as many peripheral territories declare independence and anti-Bolshevik forces rose in revolt against the new Soviet Russian order, sparking the Russian Civil War, eventually leading to the establishment of the Soviet Union.
 1917–1921: The Ukrainian Revolution: Nationalists and Soviet allies both declare separate republics in Ukraine, fighting anarchists under Nestor Makhno as well as White forces loyal to the Ukrainian State, a German puppet state.
 1918: The Finnish Civil War: Finnish Red Guards sympathetic to the Bolsheviks in Russia rise in revolt against the newly independent Finnish Whites, supported by the German Empire.
 1918: The Wilhelmshaven mutiny.
 1918: The German Revolution overthrows the Kaiser; establishment of the Weimar Republic after a brief socialist uprising by the Spartacists.
 1918: Aster Revolution ends Habsburg rule in Hungary
 1918–1919: A wave of strikes and student unrest shakes Peru. These events influence two of the dominant figures of Peruvian politics in the 20th century: Víctor Raúl Haya de la Torre and José Carlos Mariátegui.
 1918–1919: The Greater Poland Uprising, Polish uprising against German authorities.
 1918–1919: The 1919 Egyptian revolution against the British occupation of Egypt.
 1918–1920: The Georgian–Ossetian conflict, the southern Ossetians revolted against Georgian rule.
 1918–1922: The Third Russian Revolution, a failed anarchist revolution against Bolshevism.
 1918–1931: The Basmachi Revolt against Soviet Russia rule in Central Asia.
 1919: The Christmas uprising in Montenegro: Montenegrins (Zelenaši) rebelled against unification of the Kingdom of Montenegro with the Kingdom of Serbia.
1919: The Sette Giugno (Malta).
 1919-1920: The Biennio Rosso in Italy.
 1919–1920: Iraqi revolt against the British and British-Indian troops, attempting to create a Muslim regime or the restoration of Ottoman rule.
 1919–1921: The Tambov Rebellion, one of the largest peasant rebellions against the Bolshevik regime during the Russian Civil War.
 1919–1921: The Silesian uprisings of the ethnic Poles against Weimar rule.
 1919–1922: The Turkish War of Independence commanded by Mustafa Kemal Atatürk.
 1919: Simko Shikak revolt in Persia.
 1919: A revolution in Hungary, resulting in the short-lived Hungarian Soviet Republic.
 1919: Counterrevolution in Hungary against the Hungarian Soviet Republic. After many failed attempts, legitimist and other far-right forces take over Transdunabia after the Soviet Republic falls to the Romanians.
 1919: March 1st movement In Korea against the Japanese occupation (1910). Ultimately fails

1920s

 1920: The Pitchfork uprising was a peasant uprising against the Soviet policy of the war communism in what is today Tatarstan.
 1920: Kapp Putsch and the following Ruhr Uprising in Germany
 1920–1922: Patagonia Rebelde, the uprising and violent suppression of a rural workers' strike in the Argentine province of Santa Cruz in Patagonia between 1920 and 1922.
 1920–1922: Gandhi led Non-cooperation movement.
 1920: The Husino uprising in Tuzla, Bosnia and Herzegovina
 1921: The Battle of Blair Mountain ten to fifteen thousand coal miners rebel in West Virginia, assaulting mountain-top lines of trenches established by the coal companies and local sheriff's forces in the largest armed, organized uprising in American labor history.
 1921: The Kronstadt rebellion of Soviet sailors against the government of the early Russian SFSR.
 1921: The Poplar Rates Rebellion.
 1921: Brief communist takeover of Baranya county, declaring the Serbian-Hungarian Baranya-Baja Republic
 1921: Uprising in West Hungary by far-right paramilitaries resisting the Hungarian handover of Burgerland to Austria
 1921: Habsburg legitimist rebellion attempting to restore Charles IV to the throne of Hungary.
 1921: The rebellion of Mirdita led by Markagjoni declares the independence of Republic of Mirdita from Albania.
 1921–1922: The Karelian Uprising
 1921–1923: The Yakut Revolt.
 1921–1924: A revolution in (Outer) Mongolia re-establishes the country's independence and sets out to construct a Soviet-style socialist state.
 1921: The Moplah rebellion, uprising against the colonial British authority and Hindu landlords in the Malabar in South India by Mappila Muslims, aftermath of a series of peasant uprising in the past centuries.
 1921: March Action in Germany
 1922: The March on Rome, organized mass demonstration which resulted in Benito Mussolini's National Fascist Party acceding to power in the Kingdom of Italy.
 1922: The Bondelswarts Rebellion by Khoikhoi people against the apartheid regime of South West Africa. 
 1922–1923: The Irish Civil War, between supporters of the Anglo-Irish Treaty and the government of the Irish Free State and more radical members of the original Irish Republican Army who opposed the treaty and the new government.
 1923: Bajram Curri attacks gendarmerie of Kruma, Albania.
 1923: The founding of the Republic of Turkey by overthrow of the Ottoman Empire and introduction of Atatürk's Reforms.
 1923: The Klaipėda Revolt in the Memel territory that had been detached from Germany after World War I.
 1923: Küstrin Putsch in Germany
 1923: The German October, communist revolutions across Germany, including the Hamburg Uprising and Reichsexekution in Saxony and Thuringia
 1923-24: Rebellion in Pfalz, by Franz Joseph Heinz's Pfälzischen Corps
 1923: The Adwan Rebellion in Jordan.
1924–1925: The Khost rebellion in Afghanistan.
 1924: The August Uprising in Georgia against Soviet rule.
 1925: The Sheikh Said Rebellion.
 1925: The July Revolution in Ecuador.
 1925–1927: The Great Syrian Revolt, a revolt initiated by the Druze and led by Sultan al-Atrash against French Mandate.
 1926: Angry catholic peasants of Dukagjin, Shkodër fight against army and gendarmerie.
 1926: The National Revolution in Portugal initiated a period known as the National Dictatorship.
 1926–1929: The Cristero War in Mexico, an uprising against anti-clerical government policy.
 1926–1927: The first Communist rebellion in Indonesia against colonialism and imperialism of Dutch colonial government.
 1927-1937: First half of the Chinese Civil War.
 1927: Sheikh Abdurrahman rebellion by Kurdish Zazas against Turkey.
 1927–1930: The Wahhabi Rebellion of Ikhwan against Ibn Saud in Arabia.
 1927–1931: The Ağrı Rebellion by Kurds against Turkey.
 1927–1933: A rebellion led by Augusto César Sandino against the United States presence in Nicaragua.
 1928–1931: A rebellion led by Bhagat Singh against the British Rule in India.
 1929: The Women's War broke out when thousands of Igbo women traveled to the town of Oloko to protest against the Warrant Chiefs, whom they accused of restricting the role of women in the government.

1930s

 1930: The Brazilian Revolution of 1930 led by Getúlio Vargas.
 1930–1931: Nghe-Tinh Revolt in Vietnam, led by the Communist Party of Indochina, against French colonialism.
 1930–1934: The Saya San Rebellion in British Burma, led by Saya San, against British rule in Burma.
 1930: Yên Bái mutiny of Vietnam, led by Vietnamese Nationalist Party, against French Occupation.
 1930: The Salt Satyagraha, a campaign of non-violent protest against the salt tax in British India.
 1930: The Musha Incident led by the Seediq Indigenous group is the last major uprising in Japanese-controlled Taiwan.
 1932: The Constitutionalist Revolution against provisional president Getúlio Vargas led Brazil to a short civil war.
 1932: The Aprista revolt in Trujillo, Peru.
 1932: The 1932 Salvadoran peasant uprising, known as La matanza ("The Slaughter"), Pipil and peasant rebellion led by Farabundo Martí
 1932: The Siamese coup d'état of 1932, sometimes called the "Promoters Revolution", ends absolute monarchy in Thailand.
 1933: The popular revolution against Cuban dictator Gerardo Machado.
 1933: Dutch sailors on the cruiser  mutiny.
 1933: Boworadet Rebellion in Thailand
1934: Latvian coup d’état by Latvian prime minister Kārlis Ulmanis against the parliamentary system in Latvia. Lasted until 1940.
 1934: The Austrian Civil War between paramilitary forces of socialist Schutzbund and fascist Heimwehr
 1934: The Spanish Revolutionary General Strike of October took place during the black biennium of the Second Spanish Republic.
 1935: Muharrem Bajraktari, former Aide-de-camp of King Zog, led a revolt against government in North Albania.
 1935: A secret anti-Zogist organization led an uprising against the Albanian government and King Zog in Fier and Lushnje.
1935: The Communist Uprising in Rio Grande do Norte, Pernambuco and Rio de Janeiro; Brazil.
 1935–1936: Iraqi Shia revolts against Hashemite central rule.
 1935: Imam Reza shrine rebellion in Iran of Shi'ite radicals against Reza Shah.
 1935–1936: Second Italo-Ethiopian War in which Ethiopians resisted Italian occupation.
 1936: The Febrerista Revolution, led by Rafael Franco, ended oligarchic Liberal Party rule in Paraguay.
 1936: The Spanish Revolution, a workers' social revolution that began during the outbreak of the Spanish Civil War.
 1936: The Portuguese Naval revolt against the Estado Novo regime. 
 1936–1939: Arab revolt in Palestine against the British Mandate.
 1936–1939: Spanish Civil War.
 1936–1939: David Toro seizes power in Bolivia, initiating a period of so-called "military socialism", including nationalization of Standard Oil and passage of progressive labor laws, and establishing a corporative state in 1938.
 1937–1938: The Dersim Rebellion, the most important Kurdish rebellion in modern Turkey. 
 1937: The Fets de Maig or "May Days", a major strike in Catalonia, Spain.
 1937: The Revolt of Delvina, a revolt of gendarmerie and local peasants against King Zog.
 1938: Sudeten German uprising orchestrated by Sudeten German Party against Czechoslovakia.
1938: The Integralist Uprising in Rio de Janeiro, Brazil. 
 1939–1965: Spanish Maquis insurgency
 1939–1940: The Irish Republican Army attempt a sabotage campaign against British rule in Northern Ireland
 1939–1945: Resistance during World War II

1940s

 1940–1944: The Insurgency in Chechnya.
 1940: Cochinchina Uprising of Vietnam, led by Viet Minh, against French and Japanese Occupation
 1940-1944: French Resistance
 1940: Bac Son Uprising of Vietnam, led by Viet Minh, against French and Japanese Occupation
 1940–1947: Mohammad Ali Jinnah's struggle for a separate state for the Muslims of India.
 1941: The June Uprising against the Soviet Union in Lithuania.
 1941: Legionnaires' rebellion and Bucharest pogrom, Romania
 1941–1945: Yugoslav People's Liberation War against the Axis Powers in World War II.
 1941–1944: Greek Resistance
 1941: Do Luong Mutiny of Vietnam, led by Doi Cung, against French occupation
 1942: Sri Lankan soldiers ignite the Cocos Islands Mutiny in an unsuccessful attempt to transfer the islands to Japanese control.
 1942: The destruction of the German garrison in Lenin.
1942–1944: The Irish Republican Army tries to start a new campaign in Northern Ireland called the Northern Campaign and fails
 1943: The Warsaw Ghetto uprising.
 1943: The uprising at Treblinka extermination camp.
 1943: The uprising at Sobibór extermination camp.
 1943: The Woyane Rebellion in northern Ethiopia threatens to topple the newly restored government, and is put down with British help.
 1943–1945: Italian Resistance Movement against Nazi occupation and the Fascist Italian Social Republic, culminating in 25 April final insurrection in Northern Italy.
 1944: The Guatemalan Revolution overthrows the dictator Federico Ponce Vaides by liberal military officers.
 1944: The Warsaw uprising was an armed struggle during the Second World War by the Polish Home Army (Armia Krajowa) to liberate Warsaw from German occupation and Nazi rule. It started on 1 August 1944.
 1944: The Paris Uprising staged by the French Resistance against the German Paris garrison.
 1944: The Slovak National uprising against Nazi Germany.
 1944: The uprising at Auschwitz extermination camp.
 1944–1947: The Jewish insurgency in Palestine.
 1944–1947: A Communist-friendly government was installed in Bulgaria following a coup d'état and the Soviet invasion.
 1944: Following the liberation of Albania, the Communist Party of Albania under Enver Hoxha consolidated its control and declared the People's Republic of Albania in January 1946.
 1944–1949: The Greek Civil War.
 1944–1965: The Forest Brothers Rebellion in Baltic states against Soviet Union.
 1945: The first anti-communist revolt in Eastern Europe in Koplik, Albania led by bayraktars and intellectuals.
 1945–1949: The Indonesian National Revolution against Dutch after their independence from Japan. Led by Sukarno, Hatta, Tan Malaka, etc. with the Dutch led by Van Mook.
 1945: The Prague uprising against German occupation during World War II.
 1945: Ba To Uprising of Vietnam, led by Viet Minh, against French and Japanese Occupation
 1945: The August Revolution led by Ho Chi Minh and Viet Minh declared the independence of the Democratic Republic of Vietnam from French rule.
 1945: A democratic revolution in Venezuela, led by Rómulo Betancourt.
 1945-1949: Second half of the Chinese Civil War.
 1946: The Royal Indian Navy Mutiny takes place in Bombay, and spreads to different parts of British India, demanding Indian independence.
 1946 — 1951: Telangana Rebellion a Communist-led Peasant rebellion in Telangana and Hyderabad, India, ("Telangana Peasants Armed Struggle") was a Peasant rebellion against the feudal lords of the Telangana region in the princely state of Hyderabad, and later the Indian government.
 1946: Another attempt of anti-communist forces in Albania to take out the government takes place in Shkodër.
 1946: The Battle of Athens, Tennessee (aka the McMinn County War); a local revolt against officials accused of rigging local elections.
 1947: Three months after an abortive coup, civil war broke out in Paraguay. The rebellion was crushed by the government of dictator Higinio Morínigo.
 1947 : Sardar Muhammad Ibrahim Khan waged and led a guerrilla war against the Maharaja Hari Singh of Kashmir and formed a revolutionary Government on 24 October under his Presidency. He captured a large area of Kashmir called Azad Kashmir.
 1947–1952: In the Albanian Subversion, the intelligence services of the United States and Britain deployed exiled fascists, Nazis, and monarchists in a failed attempt to foment a counterrevolution in Communist-ruled Albania.
 1947: Angami Zapu Phizo declared the independence of Nagaland from India only to be subdued by the Indian army.
 1947: The 228 Massacre occurred following discontent and resentment of the native Taiwanese under the early rule of the KMT of the island.
 1947: India wins independence from Britain.
 1948: The Costa Rican Civil War precipitated by the vote of the Costa Rican Legislature, dominated by pro-government representatives, to annul the results of the presidential election of 1948.
 1948: Following the liberation of Korea, Marxist former guerrillas under Kim Il Sung work to rapidly industrialize the country and rid it of the last vestiges of "feudalism.".
 1948–1960: The Malayan Emergency.
1948-1989: The communist insurgency in Burma is launched. 
 1948: Al-Wathbah (the Leap) uprising in Iraq.
 1948 : Second Communist rebellion in Indonesia. The Communists tried to establish the Indonesian Soviet Republic, but were crushed by the Indonesian National Armed Forces.
 1949: Chinese Communist Revolution.  A period of social and political revolution in China that culminated in the establishment of the People's Republic of China in 1949.

1950s

 

 1950: The Cazin uprising in the town of Cazin, Bosnia and Herzegovina
 1950: The Puerto Rican Nationalist Party Revolts of the 1950s in Puerto Rico, attempt on the life of US president Harry S. Truman in the Blair House, and shooting at Congress, was a call for Puerto Rico's independence and uprising by the Puerto Rican Nationalist Party against United States Government rule of Puerto Rico.
 1950s: The Mau Mau uprising.
 1950: Republic of South Maluku (RMS) separatist rebellion. The rebellion was crushed by Indonesian National Armed Forces. Surviving RMS rebels founded government-in-exile in The Netherlands.
 1951: A Revolution in Nepal introduced democracy in Nepal. 
 1952: A popular revolution in Bolivia led by Víctor Paz Estenssoro and the Revolutionary Nationalist Movement (MNR) initiates a period of multiparty democracy lasting until a 1964 military coup.
 1952: The Rosewater Revolution in Lebanon.
 1952: Egyptian Revolution of 1952
 1953: The Vorkuta uprising was a major uprising of the Gulag inmates in Vorkuta in the summer of 1953. Like other camp uprisings it was bloodily quelled by the Red Army and the NKVD.
 1953: Uprising of 1953 in East Germany.
 1953–1959: The Cuban Revolution led by Fidel Castro removes the government of General Fulgencio Batista. By 1962 Cuba had been transformed into a declared socialist republic.
 1953–1975: The Laotian Civil War in Laos.
 1954–1962: The Algerian War of Independence: an uprising against French colonialism.
 1954–1968: The Civil rights movement in the United States was a struggle by African Americans to end legalized racial discrimination, disenfranchisement and racial segregation.
 1954: The Kengir uprising in the Soviet prison labor camp Kengir.
 1954: The Uyghur uprising against Chinese rule in Hotan.
 1955–1960: The Guerrilla war against British colonial rule of Cyprus led by the EOKA (National Organisation of Cypriot Fighters).
 1955–1972: The First Sudanese Civil War was a conflict between the northern part of Sudan and a south that demanded more regional autonomy.
 1955–1958: The Revolución Libertadora in Argentina.
 1956–1962: The Border Campaign led by the Irish Republican Army against the British, along the border of the independent Republic of Ireland and British Northern Ireland.
 1956: De-Stalinization revolution in the Eastern Bloc:
 The Khrushchev Thaw
 The 1956 Georgian demonstrations
 The Poznań protests, a workers' uprising in the Polish People's Republic that was suppressed.
 The Polish October
 The Hungarian Revolution, a failed workers' and peasants' revolution against the Soviet-supported communist state in Hungary.
 The Bucharest student movement
 1956: The Tibetan rebellions against Chinese rule broke out in Amdo and Kham.
 1956: Quỳnh Lưu uprising against communist government in North Vietnam
 1958: A popular revolt in Venezuela against military dictator Marcos Pérez Jiménez culminates in a civic-military coup d'état.
 1958: The Iraqi Revolution (14 July Revolution) led by nationalist soldiers abolishes the British-backed monarchy, executes many of its top officials, and begins to assert the country's independence from both Cold War power blocs.
 1959: The failed Tibetan uprising against Chinese rule led to the flight of the Dalai Lama.
 1959–1962: In the Rwandan Revolution, the Tutsi king of Rwanda is forced into exile by Hutu extremists; racial pogroms follow an assassination attempt on Hutu leader Grégoire Kayibanda.

1960s

 1960: A group of disaffected Ethiopian officers make an unsuccessful attempt to depose Emperor Haile Selassie and replace him with a more progressive government, but are defeated by the rest of the Ethiopian military.
 1960: April Revolution erupts in South Korea, leading to the end of the First Republic of South Korea.
1961: The Legality Campaign (Campanha da Legalidade) in Brazil.
1961: El Barcelonazo in Venezuela.
 1961–1970: First Kurdish Iraqi War erupts as a result of Barzanji clan uprising.
 1961–1991: The Eritrean War of Independence led by Isaias Afewerki against Ethiopia.
 1961–1975: The Angolan War of Independence began as an uprising against forced cotton harvesting, and became a multi-faction struggle for control of Portugal's Overseas Province of Angola.
 1962: El Carupanazo in Venezuela.
 1962: El Porteñazo in Venezuela.
 1962–1974: The leftist African Party for the Independence of Guinea and Cape Verde (PAIGC) wages a revolutionary war of independence in Portuguese Guinea. In 1973, the independent Republic of Guinea-Bissau is proclaimed, and the next year the republic's independence is recognized by the reformist military junta in Lisbon.
 1962: The military coup of 1962 in Burma, led by General Ne Win, who became the country's strongman.
 1962–present: Papua conflict.
 1962: A revolution in northern Yemen overthrew the imam and established the Yemen Arab Republic.
 1962–1975: Dhofar Rebellion in Oman.
 1963: White Revolution in Iran.
 1963: 1963 demonstrations in Iran.
 1963 Dutch farmers' revolt.
 1963: Syrian coup d'état in Syria that brought Ba'ath Party to power.
 1963–1970: The Bale Revolt in southern Ethiopia, was a guerrilla war by local Somali and Oromo against Amhara settlers.
 1964: Simba Rebellion in the Congo.
 1964: The Zanzibar Revolution overthrew the 157-year-old Arab monarchy, declared the People's Republic of Zanzibar, and began the process of unification with Julius Nyerere's Tanganyika.
 1964: 1964 Brazilian coup d'etat led by Field Marshal Humberto Castelo Branco against president Joao Goulart.
 1964–1979: The Rhodesian Bush War, also known as the Second Chimurenga, was a guerrilla war which lasted from July 1964 to 1979 and led to universal suffrage, the end of white minority rule in Rhodesia, and the creation of the Republic of Zimbabwe.
 1964: The October Revolution in Sudan, driven by a general strike and rioting, forced President Ibrahim Abboud to transfer executive power to a transitional civilian government, and eventually to resign.
 1964–1975: The Mozambican Liberation Front (FRELIMO), formed in 1962, commenced a guerrilla war against Portuguese colonialism. Independence was granted on 25 June 1975; however, the Mozambican Civil War complicated the political situation and frustrated FRELIMO's attempts at radical change. The war continued into the early 1990s after the government dropped Marxism as the state ideology.
 1964–present: The Colombian Armed Conflict.
 1965: 30 September Movement was a failed coup by the Communist Party to turn Indonesia into a Communist state.
 1965: The March Intifada in Bahrain: a Leftist uprising demanding an end to the British presence in Bahrain.
 1965-1983: The communist insurgency in Thailand is launched.
 1966: Kwame Nkrumah is removed from power in Ghana by coup d'état.
 1966–1990: A South African Police patrol clashes with militants of the South West African People's Organization in 1966, sparking the Namibian War of Independence. The conflict is part of the larger South African Border War and linked closely with South Africa's intervention in the Angolan Civil War. It largely ended with Namibia's first democratic elections in 1989.
 1966–1993: A guerrilla warfare was conducted against the government of François Tombalbaye from the Sudan-based group FROLINAT.
 1966–1976: Mao Zedong launches the Great Proletariat Cultural Revolution in the People's Republic of China, a sociopolitical movement to purge revisionist and bourgeois elements from the Chinese Communist Party and Chinese society at large through violent class struggle.
 1966–1998: The Ulster Volunteer Force was recreated by militant Ulster Protestant loyalists in Northern Ireland to wage war against the Irish Republican Army and the Roman Catholic community at large.
 1966: The year it is estimated the Black Power movement began, with no exact official end date.
 1967–1970: Biafra: The former eastern Nigeria unsuccessfully fought for a breakaway republic of Biafra, after the mainly Igbo people of the region suffered pogroms in northern Nigeria the previous year.
 1967: The Naxalite Movement begins in India, led by the AICCCR.
 1967: Anguillans resentful of Kittitian domination of the island expelled the Kittitian police and declared independence from the British colony of Saint Christopher-Nevis-Anguilla. British forces retook the island in 1969 and made Anguilla a separate dependency in 1980. There was no bloodshed in the entire episode.
 1967–1973: The Opposition to United States involvement in the Vietnam War begins to turn violent, the violence later escalates. Incidents include the Weather High School Jailbreaks and the Greenwich Village townhouse explosion
 1967: Pro-communist, anti-British riots in Hong Kong
 1967: Long, hot summer of 1967 – a series of 159 race riots which occurred in major cities across the United States in the summer of 1967 
1967 Buffalo riot (June 26 – July 1)
1967 Cairo riot (July 17)
1967 Cambridge riot (July 24, 1967)
1967 Detroit riot (July 23–28)
1967 Toledo riot (July 23–25)
1967 Milwaukee riot (July 30 – August 31) 
1967 Newark riots (July 12–17)
1967 Plainfield riots (July 14–16)
1967 Saginaw riot (July 26)
1967 Albina riot (July 30)
1968–present: Moro conflict in the Philippines. 
1968: The revolution in the Republic of Congo.
 1968: The Protests of 1968:
 The May 1968 revolt: students' and workers' revolt against the government of Charles de Gaulle in France.
 A failed attempt by leader Alexander Dubček to liberalise Czechoslovakia in defiance of the Soviet-supported communist state culminates in the Prague Spring.
 The March of the One Hundred Thousand was a manifestation of popular protest against the military dictatorship in Brazil, which occurred in Rio de Janeiro.
 The 1968 movement in Italy
Battle of Valle Giulia
 The 1968 student demonstrations in Yugoslavia
 The West German student movement
 A mass movement of workers, students, and peasants in Pakistan forced the resignation of President Mohammad Ayub Khan.
 The 1968 Polish political crisis
 The Mexican Movement of 1968
Tlatelolco massacre
King-assassination riots – a series of race riots following the assassination of Martin Luther King Jr.
1968 Detroit riots 
1968 New York City riot 
1968 Washington D.C. riot 
1968 Chicago riot 
1968 Pittsburgh riots 
1968 Baltimore riots 
1968 Kansas City riot 
1968 Wilmington riot 
1968 Louisville riot 
1968 Democratic National Convention protests
Columbia University protests of 1968
 1968: A coup by Juan Velasco Alvarado in Peru, followed by radical social and economic reforms.
 1968–1969 Iraqi communists launched an insurgency in southern Iraq.
 1968–1969: The Egbe Agbekoya Revolt was a successful peasant revolt in Western Nigeria.
 1969–present: Communist rebellion in the Philippines. 
 1969–1998: The Troubles: the Provisional Irish Republican Army and other Republican Paramilitaries waged an armed campaign against British Security forces and Loyalist Paramilitaries in an attempt to bring about a United Ireland.
 1969: The Days of Rage occur, part of the Opposition to United States involvement in the Vietnam War.

1970s

 1970: The Black Power Revolution occurs in Trinidad. 
 1970: A rebellion in Guinea by what its government identified as Portuguese agents.
 1970–1971: Black September in Jordan
 1971: The Bangladesh Liberation War led by the Mukti Bahini establishes the independent People's Republic of Bangladesh from the former East Pakistan.
 1971 Dutch farmers' revolt
 1972–present: The Maoist insurgency in Turkey is launched.
 1972: A revolution in Benin.
 1972: A military-led revolution against the civilian government of President Philibert Tsiranana in the Malagasy Republic; a Marxist faction takes power in 1975 under Didier Ratsiraka, modeled on the North Korean juche theory developed by Kim Il Sung.
 1973: 1973 Chilean coup d'etat led by Captain General Augusto Pinochet against President Salvador Allende in Chile.
 1973: Wounded Knee Incident. American Indian Movement activists and Oglala Lakota besiege the small town of Wounded Knee in protest of government policies towards Native Americans and the corrupt Wilson Regime. Part of the Red Power movement
 1973: Mohammad Daud Khan overthrows the monarchy and establishes a republic in Afghanistan.
 1973: Worker-student demonstrations in Thailand force dictator Thanom Kittikachorn and two close associates to flee the country, beginning a short period of democratic constitutional rule.
 1974: A revolution in Ethiopia.
 1974–1975: The Carnation Revolution overthrows the right-wing dictatorship in Portugal. Leads to the independence of Angola, Cape Verde, Mozambique, São Tomé and Príncipe and Timor-Leste and recognition of Guinea-Bissau's self-proclaimed independence.
 1975–1991: The Western Sahara War was a conflict between the Sahrawi national liberation movement named POLISARIO against the armies of their neighbours, Morocco and Mauritania, who have entered the territory when the Spanish colonizers troops fled.
 1975: A revolution in Cambodia.
 1975: Lebanese Civil War lasted from 1975 to 1990.
 1975: 15 August, coup led by young military officers and the Assassination of Sheikh Mujibur Rahman in Bangladesh.
 1975: Coup led by Brigadier Khaled Mosharraf and Colonel Shafaat Jamil in Bangladesh to depose President Khondaker Mostaq Ahmad. Three days later a counter-coup by Colonel Abu Taher puts Ziaur Rahman in power.
1975: Having become disillusioned with the rule of Leonid Brezhnev, Valery Sablin leads a mutiny in hopes of starting a Leninist revolution in the Soviet Union.
 1976-1988: The "May-Revolution" by the Kurds in North-Iraq against the government.
 1976: Student demonstrations and election-related violence in Thailand lead police to open fire on a sit-in at Thammasat University, killing hundreds. The military seizes power the next day, ending constitutional rule.
 1976: The Gang of Four is removed from power in China in a coup led by Chairman Hua Guofeng with the support of senior officers of the People's Liberation Army, ending the Cultural Revolution.
 1976: 1976 Argentine coup d'etat led by Lieutenant General Jorge Rafael Videla against President Isabel Perón.
 1977: Egyptian Bread Riots the riots were a spontaneous uprising by hundreds of thousands of lower-class people, at least 79 people were killed and 800 wounded.
 1977: The Market Women's Revolt in Guinea leads to a lessening of the state's role in the economy.
 1977: A mutiny in Bangladesh Air Force occurs, with the goal of establishing a Marxist government, resulting in the deaths of 11 air force officers. Subsequently, 1143 airmen and soldiers were executed for their alleged involvement in the uprising.
 1978: The Saur Revolution led by the Khalq faction of the People's Democratic Party of Afghanistan deposes and kills President Mohammad Daud Khan.
 1979: New Jewel Movement led by Maurice Bishop launch an armed revolution and overthrow the government of Eric Gairy in Grenada.
 1979: The popular overthrow of the Somoza dictatorship in the Nicaraguan Revolution.
 1979: Anti-Communist Rebels in Nicaragua (aka) Contras start to form.
 1979: The Iranian Revolution overthrows Shah Mohammad Reza Pahlavi, resulting in the formation of the Islamic Republic of Iran.
 1979: Cambodia is liberated from the Khmer Rouge regime by the Vietnam-backed Kampuchean People's Revolutionary Party.
 1979: 1979 Equatorial Guinea coup d'état led by Teodoro Obiang Nguema Mbasogo against Francisco Macías Nguema.
 1979–1992: Salvadoran Civil War

1980s

 1980: National Socialist Council of Nagaland launches its struggle against Indian administration and the establishment of the greater Nagaland.
 1980: 25 February. Suriname Government are put aside by a group of soldiers. The leader of the revolution is Desi Delano Bouterse.
 1980: Gwangju uprising, alternatively called the "May 18 Democratic Uprising", in South Korea
 1980: The Santo Rebellion in the Anglo-French condominium of New Hebrides
 1980–2000: The Communist Party of Peru launched the internal conflict in Peru.
 1980: First Entumbane uprising in Zimbabwe.
 1981: Assassination of Ziaur Rahman in Bangladesh sparks protests and riots.
 1982: General Hussain Muhammad Ershad seizes power through a bloodless coup, deposing president Abdus Sattar in Bangladesh.
 1983–1984: Diretas Já, a Brazilian civil unrest movement that demanded direct presidential elections. 
 1983: Overthrow of the ruling Conseil de Salut du peuple (CSP) by Marxist forces led by Thomas Sankara in Upper Volta, renamed Burkina Faso in the following year.
 1983: Prime Minister of Grenada, Maurice Bishop, overthrown and subsequently executed by high-ranking government officials.
 1983 Beginning on 23 July 1983, there was an on-and-off insurgency against the Government of Sri Lanka by the LTTE, also known as the Tamil Tigers.
 1983–2005: The Second Sudanese Civil War was largely a continuation of the First Sudanese Civil War, and one of the longest lasting and deadliest wars of the later 20th century.
 1984–1999: Kurdish uprising for independence from the Republic of Turkey
 1984–1985: Pro-independence Kanak and Socialist National Liberation Front (FLNKS) forces in New Caledonia revolt following an election boycott and occupy the town of Thio from November 1984 to January 1985. Thio is retaken by the French after the assassination of Éloi Machoro, the security minister in the FLNKS provisional government and the primary leader of the occupation.
 1985: Soviet and Afghanistan P.O.W.s rose against their captors at Badaber base.
 1986: The People Power Revolution peacefully overthrows Ferdinand Marcos after his two-decade rule in the Philippines.
 1986–1991: Somali Rebellion as a result of military dictator Siad Barre beginning to attack clan-based dissident groups.
 1986: Khalistan Commando Force started armed movement for the establishment of Khalistan, an independent Sikh homeland. The movement, as is the case with other Sikh nationalistic movements, was fueled in part by the Indian army's Operation Blue Star. The armed struggle resulted in thousands of mostly civilian deaths.
 1987 : The June Struggle overthrew military dictatorship of South Korea.
 The rigged 1987 Jammu and Kashmir Legislative Assembly election created a catalyst for the insurgency when it resulted in some of the state's legislative assembly members forming armed insurgent groups launches its struggle against Indian administration.
 1987–1991: The First Intifada, or the Palestinian uprising, a series of violent incidents between Palestinians and Israelis.
 1988–1991: The Pan-Armenian National Movement frees Armenia from Soviet rule.
 1988–1991: The Singing Revolution, bloodless overthrow of communist rule in Soviet-occupied Estonia, Latvia and Lithuania.
 1988: The 8888 Uprising In Burma or Myanmar.
 1989: Armed resistance breaks out in the Kashmir valley against Indian administration.
 1989–1990 Dutch farmers' protests against wheat price reductions and environmental legislation.
 1989–1997: The First Liberian Civil War in Liberia
 1989: Revolutions of 1989 – a series of revolutions against Communist states around the world, especially in the Soviet satellite states of the Eastern Bloc
 Strikes by the Solidarity movement end in negotiations leading to the end of martial law and the peaceful overthrow of the Communist government in Poland 
Demonstrations in Hungary lead to the peaceful overthrow of the Communist government and the dismantlement of the Hungarian border fence with Austria 
 The Tiananmen Square protests, a series of street demonstrations led by students, intellectuals and labour activists in the People's Republic of China between 15 April and 4 June 1989, ends in a violent crackdown by the People's Liberation Army.
 Demonstrations in East Germany led to the fall of the Berlin Wall.
 Demonstrations in the People's Republic of Bulgaria lead to the fall of the communist government there.
 The bloodless Velvet Revolution removes the communist government in Czechoslovakia.
 The Romanian Revolution kills the dictator Nicolae Ceauşescu and his wife, Elena Ceauşescu, in the Socialist Republic of Romania
Baltic Way demonstrations against the Soviet occupation of the Baltic States in Latvia, Lithuania, and Estonia; part of the Singing Revolution against Soviet rule leading to the independence of the Baltic States in 1991

1990s

 1990: Oka Crisis
1990: People's Movement I was a revolution to restore democracy in Nepal and end the panchayat system in Nepal.
1990–present: United Liberation Front of Asom launch major violent activities against Indian rule in Assam. To date, the resulting clashes with the Indian army have left more than 10,000 dead.
 1990: 1990 Mass Uprising in Bangladesh Strikes and Protests topple the Bangladeshi military government and democracy is restored for the first time in nine years.
 1990: The Poll tax riots were a series of riots in British towns and cities during protests against the Community Charge introduced by the government of Margaret Thatcher.
 1990–1993: Rwandan Civil War
 1990–1992: Anticommunist forces led a National Democratic Revolution that overthrew President Ramiz Alia and ended with an election victory by the Democratic Party of Albania, the biggest anticommunist party in Albania.
 1990–1995: The Log Revolution in Croatia starts, triggering the Croatian War of Independence.
 1990–1995: The First Tuareg Rebellion in Niger and Mali.
 1991–2002: The Sierra Leone Civil War against the administration of president, Joseph Saidu Momoh.
 1991: The Kurdish uprising against Iraqi President Saddam Hussein in Iraqi Kurdistan.
 1991: The Shiite Uprising in Karbala, Iraq.
 1991: The failed 1991 Soviet coup d'état attempt takes place, leading to the dissolution of the Soviet Union
 1991: The Ethiopian People's Revolutionary Democratic Front take control of Addis Ababa, the capital of Ethiopia, after dictator Haile Mariam Mengistu flees the country, bringing an end to the Ethiopian Civil War
 1991: Somali National Movement rebels establish the Somaliland administration in northwestern Somalia, and declare the region independent from the rest of the country.
 1992: 1992 Los Angeles riots
 1992: Black May (1992) Thailand popular protest in Bangkok against the government of General Suchinda Kraprayoon and the military crackdown that followed. Up to 200,000 people demonstrated in central Bangkok at the height of the protests.
 1992–1995: Bosnian War
 1992: Afghan uprising against the Taliban by United Islamic Front for the Salvation of Afghanistan, or the Northern Alliance.
 1993: Waco siege.
 1994: The 1990s Uprising in Bahrain, Shiite-led rebellion for the restoration of democracy in Bahrain.
 1994: The Zapatista Rebellion: an uprising in the Mexican state of Chiapas demanding equal rights for indigenous peoples and in opposition to growing neoliberalism in North America.
 1994–1996: The First Chechen Rebellion against Russia.
 1996–2006: Nepalese Civil War
 1996: Islamic movement in Afghanistan led by the Taliban established Taliban rule.
 1996–1997: The First Congo War in the Democratic Republic of the Congo.
 1997: The 1997 rebellion in Albania sparked by Ponzi scheme failures.
 1997–1999: The Republic of the Congo Civil War
 1998: The Indonesian Revolution of 1998 resulted the resignation of President Suharto after three decades of the New Order period.
 1998–1999: The Kosovo War
 1998–1999: The Guinea-Bissau Civil War against the administration and government of President Joao Bernardo Vieira.
 1998–2003: The Second Congo War in the Democratic Republic of the Congo.
 1999–2003: The Second Liberian Civil War against the government of Liberia.
 1999–2009: The Second Chechen Rebellion against Russia.
 1999: The Iran student protests, July 1999 were, at the time, the most violent protests to occur against the Islamic Republic of Iran.
 1999–2000: The Cochabamba Water War in Bolivia.

2000s

 2000–2005: The Second Intifada, a continuation of the First Intifada, between Palestinians and Israel.
 2000: The bloodless Bulldozer Revolution, first of the four colour revolutions (in 2000, 2003, 2004, and 2005), overthrows Slobodan Milošević's régime in Yugoslavia.
 2001: The 2001 Macedonia conflict.
 2001-2021: The Taliban insurgency following the 2001 war in Afghanistan which overthrew Taliban rule.
 2001: The 2001 EDSA Revolution peacefully ousts Philippine President Joseph Estrada after the collapse of his impeachment trial.
 2001: Supporters of former Philippine President Joseph Estrada violently and unsuccessfully stage a rally, so-called the EDSA Tres, in an attempt of returning him to power.
 2001: Cacerolazo in Argentina. Following mass riots and a period of civil unrest, popular protests oust the government and two additional interim presidents within months. December 2001 riots in Argentina
 2003–2005: Bolivian gas conflict.
 2003: The Rose Revolution, second of the colour revolutions, displaces the president of Georgia, Eduard Shevardnadze, and calls new elections.
 2003–2011: The Iraqi insurgency refers to the armed resistance by diverse groups within Iraq to the U.S. occupation of Iraq and to the establishment of a liberal democracy therein.
 2003–present: The Darfur rebellion led by the two major rebel groups, the Sudan Liberation Movement (SLM/A) and the Justice and Equality Movement, recruited primarily from the land-tilling Fur, Zaghawa, and Massaleit ethnic groups.
 2003–present: Conflict in the Niger Delta
 2004–2004: The Shi'ite Uprising against the US-led occupation of Iraq.
 2004–2005: The Orange Revolution in Ukraine. After pro-Russian prime minister Viktor Yanukovych was declared the winner of the presidential elections, people took to the streets in protest against mass fraud and vote falsification. Eventually, the country's Supreme Court ordered a recount, in which pro-Western opposition leader Viktor Yushchenko was declared the winner. This was the third colour revolution.
 2005: A failed attempt at popular colour-style revolution in Azerbaijan, led by the groups Yox! and Azadlig.
 2004: War in North-West Pakistan.
 2004–present: The Naxalite insurgency in India, led by the Communist Party of India (Maoist).
 2004–2013: The Kivu conflict in the Democratic Republic of the Congo.
 2005: The Cedar Revolution, triggered by the assassination of former Prime Minister Rafic Hariri, asks for the withdrawal of Syrian troops from Lebanon.
 2005: The Tulip Revolution (a.k.a. Pink/Yellow Revolution) overthrows the President of Kyrgyzstan, Askar Akayev, and set new elections. This is the fourth colour revolution.
 2005: Paraguayan People's Army insurgency.
 2005: 15 April Intifada – Arab uprising in the Iranian province of Khuzestan.
 2005: Ecuador experiences a nationwide and countrywide revolution, consisting of rallies and demonstrations, rioting and protests in March–April 2005 from indigenous tribes that started with a protest that mushroomed into a widespread uprising and popular movement that led to the overthrow of the government.
 2006: 2006 democracy movement in Nepal was a revolution against Undemocratic rule of King Gyanendra.
 2006: The 2006 Oaxaca protests demanding the removal of Ulises Ruiz Ortiz, the governor of Oaxaca state in Mexico.
 2006–present: The Mexican drug war.
 2007: The Lawyers' Movement in Pakistan emerged to restore a judge but eventually moved to rebel against the military dictatorship of General Pervez Musharraf.
 2007–2015: The Civil war in Ingushetia.
 2007–2009: The Second Tuareg Rebellion in Niger.
 2007: The Burmese anti-government protests, including the Saffron Revolution of Burmese Buddhist monks.
 2008: 2008 Armenian presidential election protests.
 2008: 2008 Kashmir Unrest.
 2008: A Shiite uprising in Basra.
 2008: Attacks in Lanao del Norte in the Philippines by the Moro Islamic Liberation Front led by Kumander Bravo and Umbrfa Kato.
 2008: Anti-austerity protests in Ireland
 2008: 2008 Tibetan unrest.
 2009: 2009 Iranian presidential election protests, leading to development of Iranian Green Movement
 2009: 2009 Bangladesh Rifles revolt took place in Dhaka, Bangladesh killing 57 army officers.
 2009–2011: A civil uprising popularly known as the Kitchenware Revolution brought down the Icelandic government after the collapse of the country's financial system in October 2008.
 2009: The 2009 Malagasy political crisis in the Madagascar.
 2009: The Dongo conflict In the Democratic Republic of the Congo.
 2009–present: Somali Civil War (2009–present).
 2009–2015: South Yemen insurgency.
 2009: 2009 Boko Haram uprising.
 2009–2017: Insurgency in the North Caucasus.
 2009: After a 26-year military campaign, the Sri Lankan military defeated the Tamil Tigers in May bringing the civil war to an end.

2010s 

 2010 Thai political protests.
 2010–2011: 2010–2011 Ivorian crisis.
 2010–2012: Tajikistan insurgency.
 2010: Kyrgyz Revolution of 2010.
 2010: Kashmir Unrest 2010.
 2010–2012: Anti-austerity movement in Greece
 2010–2012: Arab Spring:
 The Tunisian Revolution (2010–2011) forces President Zine El Abidine Ben Ali to resign and flee the country, and sets free elections.
 The 2011 Egyptian revolution brings down the regime of President Hosni Mubarak.
 The 2011 Libyan Civil War in which rebel forces gradually take control of the country, and kill leader Muammar Gaddafi.
 2011 Post-civil war violence in Libya.
Syrian civil war.
 Bahraini uprising of 2011.
 2011 Yemeni Revolution, the revolt that led to the eventual resignation of Ali Abdullah Saleh as President of Yemen.
 2011–present: Sinai insurgency.
2011: Cherán uprising.
2011: Wukan protests in China.
 2011–present: Sudanese conflict in South Kordofan and Blue Nile.
 2011–2017: Syrian civil war spillover in Lebanon.
 2011–present: Ethnic violence in South Sudan.
 Iraqi insurgency (2011–2013).
 2011–2013 Maldives political crisis: Public protests and police mutiny lead to resignation of President Mohamed Nasheed.
 2011–2012: Occupy movement.
 2012–present: Rojava Revolution in Syrian Kurdistan.
 2012–2015: Northern Mali conflict.
 2012–2012: 2012 Tuareg rebellion.
 2012–present: Central African Republic conflictFrançois Bozizé, president of the Central African Republic, is overthrown by the rebel coalition Séléka, led by Michel Djotodia.
 2012–2013: M23 rebellion.
 2012–2015 unrest in Romania.
2013: 2013 Protests in Brazil
 2013 Eritrean Army mutiny.
 2013: Gezi Park protests in Turkey.
 2013–present: Turkey–ISIL conflict.
 2013 South Sudanese political crisis.
 2013–14 Tunisian protests against the Ennahda-led government.
 2013–2020: South Sudanese Civil War.
 RENAMO insurgency (2013–2019).
 2013–2014: Euromaidan.
2014 Ukrainian Revolution.
 2013–14 Thai political crisis.
 2013–14 Cambodian protests.
 2014–present: 2014 Protests in Venezuela.
 Iraqi Civil War (2014–2017).
 2014–2020: Second Libyan Civil War.
 2014: Abkhazian Revolution.
 2014: The Umbrella Revolution of Hong Kong 
 2014 Burkinabé uprising.
2014: Ferguson unrest in Missouri
 2015–present: Yemeni Civil War (2015–present).
 Burundian unrest (2015–18).
 2015–present: Kurdish–Turkish conflict (2015–present).
 2015–present: ISIL insurgency in Tunisia.
2015: 2015 Baltimore protests
 2016–present: 2016 Niger Delta conflict.
 2016 Ethiopian protests.
 2016 Mong Kok civil unrest, also known as "Fishball Revolution" in Mong Kok, Hong Kong 
 2016 Turkish coup d'état attempt, a failed military coup.
 2017–present: Anglophone Crisis, also known as the Ambazonia War, or the Cameroonian Civil War. 
 2016–17 South Korean protests, or Candlelight Revolution, in South Korea.
 2016–17 Kashmir unrest.
 2016–17: United States election protests – protests challenging the outcome of the 2016 United States presidential election.
 2017 Ivory Coast mutiny.
2017: 2017 Military Police of Espírito Santo strike in Espírito Santo, Brazil.
 2017–18 Spanish constitutional crisis.
 2017–2018 Romanian protests.
 2017–2018 Iranian protests.
 2018–present: 2018–19 Arab protests:
2018 Jordanian protests.
 2018–2019: Sudanese Revolution, which resulted in the ouster of the President.
 2019–2020 Algerian protests, also called Revolution of Smiles or Hirak Movement.
 2019–present: 2019 Iraqi protests, also nicknamed the October Revolution, and 2019 Iraqi Intifada.
 2019–present: 2019–20 Lebanese protests, also referred to as the Lebanese revolt.
 2018 Armenian Velvet Revolution, which resulted in the ouster of the Prime Minister.
 2018–2019 Gaza border protests, also referred to by organizers as the "Great March of Return".
 2018–2020: 2018–20 Nicaraguan protests.
 2018–2019: 2018–2019 Haitian protests.
 2018–2019 Ingushetia protests
 2018–present: Yellow vests protests.
 2019–2020: 2019–2020 Hong Kong protests
 2019 Papua protests.
 2019 Indonesian protests and riots.
 2019 Puerto Rico Anti-Corruption / Chat scandal Protest.
 2019–present: Dutch farmers' protests.
 2019 Ecuadorian protests.
 2019–2020 Catalan protests.
 2019–2022 Chilean protests, also called "Estallido social".
 2019–2020 Iranian protests.
 2019–2020: Citizenship Amendment Act protests, in India.

2020s 

 Protests over responses to the COVID-19 pandemic – a series of protests around the world against various governments' responses to the COVID-19 pandemic, particularly lockdowns.
Strikes during the COVID-19 pandemic – strikes against  wages or low hazard pay, insufficient workplace hazard controls such as a lack of personal protective equipment or social distancing, high rents or evictions, and the pandemic's general economic impact.
 2020–2022 United States racial unrest – a series of protests against racial inequality and police brutality in the United States, sometimes in favor of abolishing or defunding the police.
George Floyd protests.
Breonna Taylor protests.
Kenosha unrest.
2020–2022 Minneapolis–Saint Paul racial unrest.
 2020–2021 Bulgarian protests – protests against Boyko Borisov's government.
 2020–2021 Belarusian protests – protests against Alexander Lukashenko's government.
 2020–2022 Thai protests – pro-democracy protests for reform to the Thai monarchy and against the 2017 Thai Constitution and Prime Minister Prayut Chan-o-cha's government.
 2020 Malian protests, also called "Malian Spring".
 2020 Inner Mongolia protests
 2020–2021 women's strike protests in Poland – protests against a Constitutional Tribunal ruling restricting abortion.
 End SARS protests – protests to abolish the Special Anti-Robbery Squad in Nigeria.
 2020 Kyrgyz protests, also called the Kyrgyz Revolution of 2020.
Indonesia omnibus law protests – protests against the Omnibus Law on Job Creation.
 2020 Peruvian protests – protests against the removal of Martín Vizcarra.
 2020 Guatemalan protests
 2020–2021 Indian farmers' protest – protests against the 2020 Indian agriculture acts.
 Tigray War – the conflict started as an uprising in Ethiopia's Tigray region led by the TPLF, but has since developed into a state of civil war in Northern Ethiopia.
 2020 United States election protests – protests challenging the legitimacy of the results in the 2020 United States presidential election.
2021 storming of the United States Capitol
Attempts to overturn the 2020 United States presidential election
 2021 Boğaziçi University protests
 2021 Tunisian protests
 2021 Russian protests
 2021–2022 Myanmar protests, also called the Spring Revolution.
 2021 Greek protests
 2021 Bangladesh anti-Modi protests
 2021 Northern Ireland riots
 2021 Colombian protests
 2021 Senegalese protests
 2021 Eswatini anti-monarchy protests
 2021 South African unrest
 2021 Brazilian protests
 2021 Cuban protests, also called the Cuba Libre movement.
 2021–2022 Iranian protests
 2021 Republican insurgency in Afghanistan
 2021–2022 Afghan protests
 2021 Solomon Islands unrest
 2021–2022 Serbian environmental protests
 2022 Kazakh unrest, also called Bloody January, known originally in Kazakhstan as Zhanaozen22.
 2022 Freedom Convoy
 2022 Sri Lankan protests
 2022 Corsica unrest
 2022 Azadi march
 2022 Karakalpak protests
 2022 Ecuadorian protests
 March–April 2022 Peruvian protests
 2022 Iranian food protests
 2022 Iranian protests
 2022 Brazilian election protests
 2022 Azadi March-II
 2022–2023 Brazilian election protests
 2022 COVID-19 protests in China
 2022–2023 Moldovan protests
 2022 Mongolian protests
 2023 invasion of the Brazilian Congress - an attack against the Praça dos Três Poderes in Brasília, Brazil, by supporters of former president Jair Bolsonaro in response to the election of Luiz Inácio Lula da Silva
 2023 Georgian protests

See also

 List of civil wars
 List of cultural, intellectual, philosophical and technological revolutions
 List of films about revolution
 List of guerrillas
 List of invasions
 List of peasant revolts
 List of rebellions in China
 List of riots
 List of strikes
 Uprisings led by women
 List of usurpers
 List of wars of independence (national liberation)
 List of women who led a revolt or rebellion
 Political history of the world
 Slave rebellion (including list of North American slave revolts)

References

History of social movements
Lists of military conflicts
Political activism
Political movements
Politics-related lists
Social history-related lists